Encontro com Patrícia Poeta (Meeting with Patrícia Poeta) is a morning talk show hosted by Patrícia Poeta, former host of É de Casa. It first aired on 25 June 2012 and is broadcast from Monday to Friday on Globo after Bem Estar (Well Being). In 2022, it was announced that Fátima Bernandes would leave the program after 10 years and as a result Patrícia Poeta was announced as the new host of the program, the change was affected on July 4th of that year.

Format
Encontro com Fátima Bernardes mixes information, humor, music, and interviews in an informal context featuring significant interaction with the live studio audience.

References

External links 
 Official website

Brazilian television talk shows
Rede Globo original programming
2012 Brazilian television series debuts
2010s Brazilian television series
2020s Brazilian television series
Portuguese-language television shows